Irada is a 2017 Indian thriller film directed by Aparnaa Singh and produced by Falguni Patel and Prince Soni. The film is written by Aparnaa Singh and Anushka Rajan, and stars Naseeruddin Shah, Arshad Warsi, Divya Dutta, Sharad Kelkar, Sagarika Ghatge in lead roles.

The film raises the contemporary ecological issues of uranium poisoning, reverse boring, fertilizer poisoning due to the green revolution and their immediate adverse impact on the people who live in Malwa region.

Plot 
The film is set in Bathinda, with its thermal power plants and factories in the background and is based on the true story of this city and its people.

The daughter of an ex Army man (Naseeruddin Shah) discovers that she has a serious life-threatening illness. Gradually they piece together the reason for this and discover that it is due to the carcinogenic elements that have entered the ground water. Everyone in the city is affected by it.

A journalist meanwhile has discovered files that will incriminate the people responsible for this ground water poisoning, but he is kidnapped and missing. His girl friend (Sagarika Ghatge), who is also a journalist pursues the case, trying to convince the authorities to arrest the people responsible.

Meanwhile, a mysterious bomb blast in a business tycoon (Sharad Kelkar)'s factory prompts the state CM (Divya Dutta) to hire an NIA officer (Arshad Warsi). He meets the ex-army man seeking revenge for his dead daughter and the journalist demanding justice for her slain boyfriend. He himself tries to balance his knowledge of the truth, his wish for a more stable posting (having just come from a Naxal region), a better family life and his conscience.

Cast 

 Naseeruddin Shah as Lt Col Parabjeet Walia (Retd)
 Arshad Warsi as NIA Officer Arjun Mishra
 Sharad Kelkar as Paddy F Sharma
 Sagarika Ghatge as Maya Singh
 Divya Dutta as Ramandeep Braitch, CM- Paddy's mistress
 Diwakar Kumar as Jagat Sinha 
 Nikhil Pandey as Maya’s boyfriend 
 Rajesh Sharma as Jeetu Arora- Paddy's Manager
 Prashant Gupta as Bhagat Singh
 Savita Bhatti as Harmeet Braitch
 Rumana Molla as Riya Walia
 Prince Soni as Sunday Singh
 Rohan Shah as Ricky Bhullar
 Radhika Bangia as Ruby Gill
 Rajeev Mehta as Abdul Hasan
 Mehtaab as Nanu Hasan
 Lubhani Attwal as Dolly Chadha
 Seerat Kaur as Mitali Sharma

Soundtrack 

The soundtrack of the film consists of 4 songs all of which have been composed by Neeraj Sridhar, while the lyrics have been penned by Sameer Anjaan. The first song titled "Mahi" from the movie was released on 3 February 2017, along with the music video. The full movie jukebox was unveiled on 17 February 2017 and it consists 4 songs in total, including the movie theme song. The music rights are bought by Times Music.

The film also uses Hindi poetry and Urdu Shayari to convey its message at critical junctures. Parts of the Hindi poet Dushyant Kumar's poem ""Ho Gayi hai Peer Parvat Si"(हो गई है पीर पर्वत-सी)" have been used by Naseeruddin Shah's character, especially during a book launch, to convey that people need to speak out and rise when they see injustice. Similar, contemporary Urdu shayari by Nawaz Deo bandhi has been used at critical junctures.

Critical reception 

On review aggregator website Rotten Tomatoes, Irada has an approval score of 57% on the basis of 7 reviews with an average rating of 4.6 out of 10. Rohit Vats of Hindustan Times rated the film 3 out of 5 stars and said, "Constructed on the lines of A Wednesday!, Irada tries to look like a thriller but fails to sustain the initial momentum as many sub-stories cross paths." Saibal Chattarjee of NDTV rated the film 3 out of 5 and said, "Irada is a gripping enough tale somewhat undermined by its two facile villains – one represents the manipulative big corporations, the other the pliant political class." Nandini Ramnath of Scroll.in praised the performances of the actors and said that, "‘Irada’ is a well-intended expose of pollution and graft. A superb cast and some smart writing paper over the flaws in Aparnaa Singh’s debut movie." Mohar Basu of Mid-Day gave the film a rating of 2 out of 5 saying that, "Irada' has an overcrowded plot with facile characters, and lacks both the required energy and depth of the subject. There are too many parallel narratives and Aparnaa Singh's limited directorial skills aren't enough to handle the snags" Udita Jhunjhunwala of LiveMint praised the concept of the film and the performances of actors Naseeruddin Shah and Arshad Warsi but criticized the execution of the film saying that, "While there’s no faulting Irada’s intentions, the narrative is poorly crafted and clumsily executed." Namrata Joshi of The Hindu said that, "Irada has its heart in the right place—dealing with the theme of ecological and human hazards that points to big corporations and their irresponsible disposed of chemical wastes. But alas, it fails to fashion a compelling film out of it."

Meena Iyer of The Times of India praised the concept of the film saying that, "Irada has its heart in the right place. Having picked up a subject that talks of environmental hazards, debutant director Aparnaa Singh’s conscientious streak shows" but criticized its writing saying that, "the film’s failing is  amateur writing and execution. You can see that the maker is crushed under the weight of the material chosen". The critic gave the film a rating of 2.5 out of 5. Box Office India said, "Aparnaa Singh's direction makes Irada a gripping and an intriguing film, which opens your eyes to some harsh realities in the world." Shubha Shetty Saha from Catch News rated the film 3.5 out of 5 stars and said, "Arshad Warsi and Naseeruddin Shah surprise us with this socially relevant thriller!" Stutee Ghosh of The Quint gave the film a rating of 2.5 out of 5 saying that, "‘Irada’ is well intentioned. Unfortunately, however, it suffers from amateurish execution. It has some nice touches but it never truly comes together. Still, it deals with an important issue that should reach more people and it definitely merits attention." Rachit Gupta of Filmfare gave the film a rating of 1.5 out of 5 and said that, "The clichéd story telling, the jaded treatment, this film massacres its objective – that of highlighting the rampant pollution of habitats in Punjab. The only silver lining to this film is watching the great cast trying to lend respectability to a movie that least deserves it."

Awards and nominations

References

External links 
 
 Irada Collection  at ThatsBreaking 

Indian thriller drama films
2017 films
Films scored by Neeraj Shridhar
2010s Hindi-language films
Films featuring a Best Supporting Actress National Film Award-winning performance
Best Film on Environment Conservation/Preservation National Film Award winners